Henri J. Nussbaumer is a French engineer born in Paris, France in 1931.

After graduating in 1954 from the Ecole Centrale Paris, he joined IBM in the Paris development laboratory where he initially worked on solid state circuits. In 1960, he transferred to the IBM Poughkeepsie laboratory and worked on electrodeposition of magnetic films. In 1962, he returned to IBM France in La Gaude as manager of an advanced development group.

He was manager of line switching product development in 1964, manager of technology from 1965 to 1973 and manager of the Education and Technical Vitality Program from 1973 to 1975 when he was named IBM Fellow.

Henri Nussbaumer left IBM in 1981 to found the Industrial Computer Engineering laboratory at the Swiss Federal Institute of Technology in Lausanne (EPFL). He is one of the fathers of the Institut Eurécom in Sophia Antipolis. Henri Nussbaumer retired in 1996.

Selected papers

Books

External links 
 H. Nussbaumer launches the idea of the Eurecom Institute
 Eurecom Institute

IBM Fellows
Living people
Year of birth missing (living people)